Koforidua Sports Stadium is  suituated  in koforidua, the capital of Eastern Region in Ghana. It is used mostly for football matches and is the home stadium of Power FC. The stadium holds 5,000 people. It is the only sports stadium located in the Eastern Region.

The Sports Minister Hon. Isaac Kwame Asiamah has cut sod for the upgrading of the Koforidua Sports Stadium to a modern standard sports facility. The project, according to the Minister, is part of the government's plan to build international standard sports stadia. The sport stadium upgrading is part of the agenda of President Nana Addo Dankwa Akufo-Addo to ensure that all regions in the country have modern sporting facilities. The upgrading stadium will not only be a football pitch. It will have several facilities including a FIFA standard pitch, a tennis court, a taekwondo and badminton center as well as a basketball and volleyball court.

References

Football venues in Ghana
Koforidua